Granomarginata is a genus of spherical Cambrian acritarchs interpreted as a phytoplankton.

References 

Acritarch genera
Cambrian life